Sweetwater, Florida may refer to:

 Sweetwater, Miami-Dade County, Florida
 Sweetwater, Duval County, Florida
 Sweetwater Ranch, Florida
 Sweetwater, Liberty County, Florida